Turbonilla elegantula is a species of sea snail, a marine gastropod mollusk in the family Pyramidellidae, the pyrams and their allies.

Description
The length of the shell varies between 3 mm and 6 mm.

Distribution
This marine species occurs in the following locations:
 Caribbean Sea
 Colombia
 Cuba
 Gulf of Mexico
 Mexico
 Northwest Atlantic : from Massachusetts to North Carolina.
 Puerto Rico

Notes
Additional information regarding this species:
 Distribution: Range: 41.5°N to 35.3°N; 75.5°W to 70.7°W. Distribution: USA: Massachusetts, Connecticut, Virginia, North Carolina

References

External links
 To Biodiversity Heritage Library (6 publications)
 To Encyclopedia of Life
 To ITIS
 To World Register of Marine Species
 

elegantula
Gastropods described in 1882